Kurzeme is the Latvian name for Courland, a historical and cultural region of Latvia.

It may also refer to:
 Kurzemes guberņa, the Latvian name of Courland Governorate
 Kurzeme Planning Region, a planning region of Latvia
 Kurzeme Statistical Region, a statistical region of Latvia
 Kurzeme Province, a province in Republic of Latvia (1918–1940)
 Kurzeme District, Riga, an administrative district of Riga, Latvia
 Courland (Saeima constituency), constituency of the Saeima, the national legislature of Latvia, known as Kurzeme in Latvian

See also
 Courland (disambiguation)